Gael Baudino (born 1955) is a contemporary American fantasy author who also writes under the pseudonyms of Gael Kathryns, Gael A. Kathryns, K.M. Tonso, and G.A. Kathryns.  She attended college at the University of Southern California.  Sometime before 1994 she converted from Dianic Wicca and became a Quaker.
As Gael Kathryns she contributed several instructional articles about harping to the Folk Harp Journal during the 1990s.

Bibliography

The Dragonsword Trilogy
Dragonsword (1988) 
Duel of Dragons (1991) 
Dragon Death (1992)

The Strands Series
Strands of Starlight (1989)  
Maze of Moonlight (1993) 
Shroud of Shadow (1993) 
Strands of Sunlight (1994) 
Spires of Spirit (1997)  - A collection of six short stories set in the "Strands" universe.  One of its stories, "The Shadow of the Starlight", was previously published in slightly different form in the April 1985 issue of The Magazine of Fantasy and Science Fiction.

The Water! series
O Greenest Branch! (1995) 
The Dove Looked In (1996) 
Branch and Crown (1996)

Standalone
Gossamer Axe (1990) 
The Borders of Life (1999) as G.A. Kathryns.   This book is previewed in the back of Spires of Spirit with the working title of The Bournes of Life.  The preview identifies Gael Baudino as the author rather than G.A. Kathryns.
 Darkling Incidence (2015) as K.M Tonso. .
 Snow City (2017) as G.A. Kathryns.

Short stories
"Lady of the Forest End" - Amazons II edited by Jessica Amanda Salmonson (1982) 
"The Shadow of the Starlight" - published in:
The Magazine of Fantasy and Science Fiction (April 1985)
An edited/updated version published in 1997 in Spires of Spirit.
"The Persistence of Memory" - published in:
The Magazine of Fantasy and Science Fiction (November 1985)
The Year's Best Fantasy 12 edited by Arthur W. Saha (1986) 
The Bank Street Book of Fantasy edited by Howard Zimmerman (1989) .  This is a book of short stories converted into graphic novels for early teen readers.
"Tidings of Comfort and Joy" edited by Dennis L. McKiernan - The Magic of Christmas (1992) 
"Before" - Lammas Night edited by Mercedes Lackey  (1996)  - this story occurs in the same setting as Baudino's novel The Borders of Life.
"Bitterfoot" - Sisters in Fantasy 2 edited by Susan Schwartz (1996) 
"Charity" - written between 1981 and 1984 and published in 1997 in Spires of Spirit.
"Lady of Light" - written between 1981 and 1984 and published in 1997 in Spires of Spirit.
"A Touch of Distant Hands" - written between 1981 and 1984 and published in 1997 in Spires of Spirit.
"Elvenhome" - written between 1981 and 1984 and published in 1997 in Spires of Spirit.
"Please Come to Denver (in the Spring)" - written between 1981 and 1984 and published in 1997 in Spires of Spirit.

Nonfiction works
The Wire Strung Primer (as Gael Kathryns) - Raging Celt Productions, Englewood, Colorado, 1991
Interzone Science Fiction magazine #90 (1994), page 19-22. Interview by David V. Barrett: "Music and Magic"

Recordings
For Martha (as Gael Kathryns) - RC901 Raging Celt Productions, Englewood, Colorado, 1990  - original harp music

References

External links
, archive of a fan page
, archive of SciFan page

1955 births
20th-century American novelists
American fantasy writers
American women short story writers
American women novelists
Dianic Wicca
Living people
American Quakers
Converts to Quakerism
Converts to Protestantism from pagan religions
Lambda Literary Award winners
Women science fiction and fantasy writers
20th-century American women writers
20th-century American short story writers
21st-century American women